Maggie Adamson is a musician from Shetland, Scotland, who plays fiddle, violin, accordion and piano. She has played with several groups including Swingin’ Fiddles but is perhaps best known for her collaboration with Shetland guitarist Brian Nicholson.

Awards and achievements
2007 - Winner of Shetland Young Fiddler of the Year competition
2008 - Winner of Danny Kyle Open Stage Award at Celtic Connections
2008 - Winner of seven prizes including best overall junior fiddler and original composition at the National Association of Fiddle and Accordion Clubs' festival
2009 - Nominee for Up and Coming Artist of the Year at the Scots Trad Music Awards

Discography
Take Note - Swingin' Fiddles (Jan 2006)
Wir Waanderins - Swingin' Fiddles (Dec 2006)
Tammie Norrie - Maggie Adamson & Brian Nicholson (Feb 2008)
Anidder Een! - Maggie Adamson & Brian Nicholson (Nov 2008)
Back to the Hills - Maggie Adamson & Brian Nicholson (Jan 2010)
Hameaboot- Maggie Adamson & Brian Nicholson (Dec 2011)
Here 'n Now- Maggie Adamson & Brian Nicholson (Dec 2015)

References

People from Shetland
Shetland music
Living people
Shetland fiddlers
21st-century violinists
Year of birth missing (living people)